The 2022–23 Lafayette Leopards men's basketball team represented Lafayette College in the 2022–23 NCAA Division I men's basketball season. The Leopards, led by first-year head coach Mike Jordan, played their home games at the Kirby Sports Center in Easton, Pennsylvania as members of the Patriot League. They finished the season 11–23, 7–11 in Patriot League play to finish in a four-way tie for sixth place. As the No. 6 seed in the Patriot League tournament, they defeated Lehigh and American to advance to the tournament championship for the first time since 2015. There they lost to Colgate.

On February 21, 2023 (two games before the end of the season), Jordan was placed on administrative leave following a complaint. Mike McGarvey was appointed as acting head coach.

Previous season
The Leopards finished the 2021–22 season 10–20, 7–11 in Patriot League play to finish in a tie for seventh place. In the Patriot League tournament, they were defeated in overtime by Bucknell in the first round. During the season, on January 21, longtime head coach Fran O'Hanlon announced that he would retire at the end of the season, ending his 27-year run as the head coach. On March 29, Colgate assistant Mike Jordan was named as O'Hanlon's successor.

Roster

Schedule and results

|-
!colspan=12 style=| Non-conference regular season

|-
!colspan=12 style=| Patriot League regular season

|-
!colspan=9 style=| Patriot League tournament

|-

Sources

References

Lafayette Leopards men's basketball seasons
Lafayette Leopards
Lafayette Leopards men's basketball
Lafayette Leopards men's basketball